Patrón is a brand of tequila products by the Patrón Spirits Company with 40% Alcohol in each bottle. 

Patrón Tequilas, like all tequilas, are produced in Mexico from the "corazon" (heart or core) of the blue agave plant. Everything including the barrels, corks, and bottles are handcrafted at their distilleries.

History
The original Patrón Tequila was produced by Casa 7 Leguas, one of the oldest Mexican distilleries. St. Maarten Spirits (owners John Paul DeJoria and Martin Crowley) purchased the brand rights in 1989 and in 2002 production moved to a new distillery.

In 2000, Ed Brown, co-founder of Patrón and former Seagram executive, took over as CEO.

In January 2018, Patrón was sold to Bacardi, the world's largest privately held spirits company, for $5.1 billion.

In 2022, Patrón Tequila introduced Patrón El Alto a new expression consisting of a blend of Extra Añejo, Añejo, and Reposado tequilas. Patrón El Alto has been aged in 11 types of barrels and is only available in New York, Miami, Las Vegas, and Los Angeles.

Advertising
Following the advertising strategy of Grey Goose, Patrón presented its tequila as "premium" and signaled "taste and sophistication" through individually-numbered glass bottles. The target audience is mostly vodka drinkers in nightclubs and trendy bars. Through persistent references by country music and hip hop singers, and by Lil Jon in particular, Patrón has become a fixture of popular culture.

The brand logo is set in the Algerian typeface.

Varieties
Varieties include a tequila-coffee blend known as Patrón XO Cafe, a tequila-chocolate-coffee blend known as Patrón XO Cafe Dark Cocoa, and an orange liqueur known as Patrón Citrónge.

 Gran Patrón Burdeos
 Gran Patrón Platinum
 Gran Patrón Piedra
 Patrón Silver
 Patrón Añejo
 Patrón Reposado
Roca Patrón Silver
Roca Patrón Reposado
Roca Patrón Añejo
 Patrón XO Cafe
Patron XO Cafe is a premium coffee flavoured version of Patron.
 Patrón XO Cafe Dark Cocoa
 Patrón XO Cafe Incendio
 Patrón Citrónge
 Patrón Lime
 Patrón Mango
 Estate Release

See also
Patrón Tequila Express
Patron (disambiguation)

References

External links
The Patrón Spirits Company
Patrón Tequila
Patrón breaks into Eastern Europe
Liquor

Tequila
Mexican brands